The 2013–14 season was Doncaster Rover's 11th consecutive season in the Football League and their 5th season in the second tier of English football, following their promotion from League One in the 2012–13 season. They were relegated back to the third tier at the end of the season, after finishing in 22nd place in the Championship.

Championship data

League table

Result summary

Result by round

Kit

|
|

Squad

Detailed overview

Statistics

|-
|colspan="14"|Players who left the club during the season:

|}

Captains

Goals record

Disciplinary record

Contracts

Transfers

In

 Total outgoings:  ~ Undisclosed

Loans in

Out

 Total income:  ~ £0

Fixtures

Pre-season

Championship

League Cup

FA Cup

Overall summary

Summary

Score overview

2013-14
2013–14 Football League Championship by team